Cymbopogon, also known as lemongrass, barbed wire grass, silky heads, Cochin grass, Malabar grass, oily heads, citronella grass or fever grass, is a genus of Asian, African, Australian, and tropical island plants in the grass family.
Some species (particularly Cymbopogon citratus) are commonly cultivated as culinary and medicinal herbs because of their scent, resembling that of lemons (Citrus limon).
Lemongrass and its oil are believed to possess therapeutic properties.

Uses

These species are used for the production of citronella oil, which is used in soaps, as an insect repellent (especially mosquitoes and houseflies) in insect sprays and candles, and aromatherapy. The principal chemical constituents of citronella, geraniol and citronellol, are antiseptics, hence their use in household disinfectants and soaps. Besides oil production, citronella grass is also used for culinary purposes as a flavoring.

East Indian lemongrass (Cymbopogon flexuosus), also called Cochin grass or Malabar grass, is native to Cambodia, Vietnam, Laos, India, Sri Lanka, Burma, and Thailand, while West Indian lemongrass (Cymbopogon citratus) is native to maritime Southeast Asia. While both can be used interchangeably, C. citratus is more suitable for cooking.

In India, C. citratus is used as a medical herb and in perfumes. C. citratus is consumed as a tea for anxiety in Brazilian folk medicine, but a study in humans found no effect. The tea caused a recurrence of contact dermatitis in one case. In the Caribbean, the tea is also brewed and consumed to boost immunity. It is called Tanglad in the Philippines, where it is believed that it has health benefits for the liver and the kidneys.

One study found the tea may exert an erythropoiesis boosting effect.

In Hoodoo, lemongrass is the primary ingredient of van van oil, one of the most popular oils used in conjure. Lemongrass is used in this preparation and on its own in hoodoo to protect against evil, spiritually clean a house, and to bring good luck in love affairs.

In beekeeping, lemongrass oil imitates the pheromone emitted by a honeybee's Nasonov gland to attract bees to a hive or a swarm.

Species
Species included in the genus include:

 Cymbopogon ambiguus (Australian lemon-scented grass) – Australia, Timor
 Cymbopogon annamensis – Yunnan, Laos, Vietnam, Thailand
 Cymbopogon bhutanicus – Bhutan
 Cymbopogon bombycinus silky oilgrass – Australia
 Cymbopogon caesius – Sub-Saharan Africa, Indian Subcontinent, Yemen, Afghanistan, Madagascar, Comoros, Réunion
 Cymbopogon calcicola – Thailand, Kedah
 Cymbopogon calciphilus – Thailand
 Cymbopogon cambogiensis – Thailand, Cambodia, Vietnam
 Cymbopogon citratus (lemon grass or West Indian lemon grass) – Indonesia, Malaysia, Brunei, Philippines
 Cymbopogon clandestinus – Thailand, Myanmar, Andaman Islands
 Cymbopogon coloratus – Madhya Pradesh, Tamil Nadu, Myanmar, Vietnam
 Cymbopogon commutatus – Sahel, East Africa, Arabian Peninsula, Iraq, Iran, Afghanistan, India, Pakistan
 Cymbopogon densiflorus – central + south-central Africa
 Cymbopogon dependens – Australia
 Cymbopogon dieterlenii – Lesotho, Namibia, South Africa
 Cymbopogon distans – Gansu, Guizhou, Shaanxi, Sichuan, Tibet, Yunnan, Nepal, northern Pakistan, Jammu & Kashmir
 Cymbopogon exsertus – Nepal, Assam
 Cymbopogon flexuosus (East Indian lemon grass) – Indian Subcontinent, Indochina
 Cymbopogon gidarba – Indian Subcontinent, Myanmar, Yunnan
 Cymbopogon giganteus – Africa, Madagascar
 Cymbopogon globosus – Maluku, New Guinea, Queensland
 Cymbopogon goeringii – China, Korea, Japan incl Ryukyu Islands, Vietnam
 Cymbopogon gratus – Queensland
 Cymbopogon jwarancusa – Socotra, Turkey, Middle East, Arabian Peninsula, Iraq, Iran, Afghanistan, Indian Subcontinent, Tibet, Sichuan, Yunnan, Vietnam
 Cymbopogon khasianus – Yunnan, Guangxi, Assam, Bhutan, Bangladesh, Myanmar, Thailand
 Cymbopogon liangshanensis – Sichuan
 Cymbopogon mandalaiaensis – Myanmar
 Cymbopogon marginatus – Cape Province of South Africa
 Cymbopogon martini (palmarosa) – Indian Subcontinent, Myanmar, Vietnam
 Cymbopogon mekongensis – China, Indochina
 Cymbopogon microstachys Indian Subcontinent, Myanmar, Thailand, Yunnan
 Cymbopogon microthecus – Nepal, Bhutan, Assam, West Bengal, Bangladesh
 Cymbopogon minor – Yunnan
 Cymbopogon minutiflorus – Sulawesi
 Cymbopogon nardus (citronella grass) – Indian Subcontinent, Indochina, central + southern Africa, Madagascar, Seychelles
 Cymbopogon nervatus – Myanmar, Thailand, central Africa
 Cymbopogon obtectus Silky-heads – Australia
 Cymbopogon osmastonii – India, Bangladesh
 Cymbopogon pendulus – Yunnan, eastern Himalayas, Myanmar, Vietnam
 Cymbopogon polyneuros – Tamil Nadu, Sri Lanka, Myanmar
 Cymbopogon pospischilii – eastern + southern Africa, Oman, Yemen, Himalayas, Tibet, Yunnan
 Cymbopogon procerus – Australia, New Guinea, Maluku, Lesser Sunda Islands, Sulawesi
 Cymbopogon pruinosus – islands of Indian Ocean
 Cymbopogon queenslandicus – Queensland
 Cymbopogon quinhonensis – Vietnam
 Cymbopogon rectus – Lesser Sunda Islands, Java
 Cymbopogon refractus (barbed wire grass) – Australia incl Norfolk Island
 Cymbopogon schoenanthus (camel hay or camel grass) – Sahara, Sahel, eastern Africa, Arabian Peninsular, Iran
 Cymbopogon tortilis – China incl Taiwan, Ryukyu + Bonin Is, Philippines, Vietnam, Maluku
 Cymbopogon tungmaiensis – Sichuan, Tibet, Yunnan
 Cymbopogon winterianus (citronella grass) – Borneo, Java, Sumatra
 Cymbopogon xichangensis – Sichuan

Formerly included
Numerous species are now regarded as better suited to other genera, including Andropogon, Exotheca, Hyparrhenia, Iseilema, Schizachyrium, and Themeda.

Images

References

Bibliography

 

 
Grasses of Africa
Grasses of Asia
Poaceae genera
Poales of Australia
Medicinal plants
Andropogoneae